"How I Feel" is a song co-written and recorded by American country music singer Martina McBride.  It was released in May 2007 as the second single from the album Waking Up Laughing.  McBride wrote the song with Aimee Mayo, Chris Lindsey and The Warren Brothers.

Music video
A live video of McBride performing the song at the 2007 CMA Music Fest was released to GAC and CMT in August 2007.

Chart performance

References

2007 singles
2007 songs
Martina McBride songs
Songs written by Martina McBride
Songs written by Chris Lindsey
Songs written by Aimee Mayo
Songs written by the Warren Brothers
RCA Records Nashville singles